Mahasabha may refer to:
 Hindu Mahasabha
 Jat Mahasabha
 Andhra Mahasabha
 Jatav Mahasabha
 All India Yadav Mahasabha
 Ahir Yadav Kshatriya Mahasabha
 All India Kurmi Kshatriya Mahasabha
 Akhil Bharatiya Kshatriya Mahasabha
 Nikhil Manipuri Mahasabha
 Digambar Jain Mahasabha
 Ganga Mahasabha
 Bunkar Mahasabha
 Bharatiya Bauddha Mahasabha
 Kshatriya Koli Mahasabha
 Sinhala Maha Sabha